VR Troopers is a syndicated live action superhero-adventure television series produced and distributed by Saban Entertainment from 1994 to 1996. The show tried to profit from the fascination with virtual reality in the mid-1990s as well as the success of Saban's other property, Power Rangers. VR Troopers was the first official "sister series" to Mighty Morphin' Power Rangers. Much like it, this was an Americanization of a Japanese tokusatsu children's program series by Toei Company. The series is a co-production of Toei and Cyberprod.

The show featured early CGI and video effects mixed with Japanese stock footage from three different Metal Hero Series: Superhuman Machine Metalder, Dimensional Warrior Spielban and Space Sheriff Shaider. On May 7, 2010, the copyright for VR Troopers was transferred from BVS Entertainment to Saban Capital Group.

While the series was almost as successful as Power Rangers, it was canceled after only two seasons. This was primarily because the available Japanese footage was quickly exhausted. In a number of extreme cases, multiple tokusatsu scenes were put together in one episode, forcing stock footage to be reused multiple times throughout the series. Big Bad Beetleborgs, another Saban adaptation of a Metal Heroes series, encountered similar problems. The show spawned a toy line and a video game for the Sega Genesis and Game Gear.

Plot
The show focused on three teenagers in their late teens, Ryan Steele, Kaitlin Star, and J.B. Reese, living in the fictional West Coast town of Cross World City, California. They regularly attended and were teachers at "Tao's Dojo," a karate studio. Ryan was the most focused martial artist; J.B. was the computer wizard; while Kaitlin was a photographer and budding reporter for the local newspaper, the Underground Voice Daily. One day, Ryan's search for his long-missing father led him and his two friends to a strange laboratory. Inside, a digitized head of Professor Horatio Hart (who is a friend of Ryan's father Tyler) explained the truth about his life's work of having developed extremely advanced virtual reality technology in secret.  "VR" is a dimension existing alongside our own; within it lie mutants, aiming at conquering both worlds. The main ruler of these is a creature known as Grimlord, who, unbeknownst to anyone on Earth, has a human identity as billionaire industrialist Karl Ziktor. As Karl Ziktor tries to overcome the barriers of the true reality to allow his armies easy passage from the virtual world, the responsibility of defending the planet on both sides of the dimensional barrier falls on Ryan, Kaitlin and J.B.. They have assistance in the form of armored bodies having incredible firepower. This includes eventual additions to their arsenal, such as a Turbo Cycle, Techno Bazooka, VR Troopertron, VR Shoulder Cannon, VR Battlecruiser/Interceptor and a flying, laser-blasting Skybase.

Among other regular characters on the show, Zeb as Jeb, Ryan's hound dog that, after an accident in Professor Hart's lab, becomes capable of human speech; Woody Stocker, Kaitlin's wacky hat-loving boss at the Underground Voice Daily; Percival "Percy" Rooney, the local mayor's nephew and Kaitlin's bumbling rival reporter; and Tao, the wise martial arts sensei who owns the dojo and a family friend of the Steele Family. Recurring villains include General Ivar, Colonel Icebot, Decimator, the Skugs and more throughout.

During the second season, the show changed format very slightly. Ryan's father Tyler was finally found and restored to normal. Then he quickly left to help the government research further Virtual Reality based technology. With him came Ryan's new V.R. armor and an upgrade to his powers. Grimlord's base of operations switched from the virtual dungeon to a massive spacecraft and added new Generals such as Oraclon, Despera, Doom Master and his Vixens. The Skugs now had the ability to become more powerful in the form of Ultra Skugs.

Cast and characters

 Brad Hawkins as Ryan Steele
 Sarah Brown as Kaitlin Star
 Michael Hollander (credited as Michael Bacon) as J. B. Reese
 Gardner Baldwin as Ziktor/Grimlord
 Julian Combs as Professor Hart
 Richard Rabago as Tao
 Michael Sorich as Woody
 Aaron Pruner as Percy

Production

Pre-production
In pre-production, the series was known as Psycon and Cybertron, focusing on a single hero with a technological theme instead of a team of heroes with a virtual reality theme.

In the Psycon pilot script, the main character was Adam Steele who merged with the cyborg Psycon instead of transforming into it. The enemy was Grimlord, whose alter ego was Cyrus Ritker, who led a robot army known as Cyberdrones. Cyrus had a son called Percy who was Adam's martial arts rival. Adam's mentor and caretaker was a martial arts sensei called Tao. Adam was friends with Tao's daughter Mia, and a young kid called Mouse MacKenzie.

The Cybertron pilot starred Jason David Frank as Adam Steele and drew its source footage from Metalder. Frank's character was depicted as a solo hero going up against an army of robots known as Wardrones who were led by Grimlord. Grimlord's alter ego in the pilot was Cyrus Rikter (Gardner Baldwin), who had a son named Percy, who was Adam's martial arts rival. Tao Chong (Richard Rabago) served as Adam's caretaker and mentor. Tao also had a daughter named Mia and Doug Sloan played the part of Tyler Steele in flashbacks. The pilot included a pair of bumbling news reporters named Elmo (played by Jamie Kennedy) and Scuzzy, who would've served as the series' comic relief. Its theme song was based on Ron Wasserman's "Go Green/White Ranger Go" song in the Power Rangers series.

VR Troopers

In the original VR Troopers promo, Kaitlin had the last name of "Hall" instead of "Star" and Professor Hart was played by a different actor with an entirely different voice and personality than the Professor that was later used.

Like Power Rangers, VR Troopers used a combination of American footage spliced with fight scenes from Japanese shows. The Japanese shows adapted in to VR Troopers are Space Sheriff Shaider, Dimensional Warrior Spielban, and Choujinki Metalder. All three come from Toei's Metal Hero Series. Choujinki Metalder provided footage of Ryan Steele's season one robotic suit, Grimlord, the Virtual Dungeon, Grimlord's four lieutenants, Dark Heart, and the military-type robots that are featured in several episodes, as well as the exterior of Ziktor Industries. Dimensional Warrior Spielban provided footage of J.B.'s and Kaitlin's robotic suits, Ivar, Icebot, skugs, and the battle scenes involving the Skybase, shark cruisers, tanks, and fighter jets. Space Sheriff Shaider provided the new footage for season two, including Ryan Steele's season two robotic suit and the ultra-skugs.

Out of all of Saban's tokusatsu adaptations, VR Troopers uses the oldest source-footage of any series. Shaider was aired from 1984 to early 1985, making it 10 years old when first used for VR Troopers in 1995; Spielban was aired from 1986 to early 1987, making it eight years old when originally used in 1994; and Metalder was originally aired in 1987 to early 1988, making it seven years old when it was adapted in 1994.

Because more than one Japanese show was used in an episode at any given time, Ryan's alter-ego was never in the same action scene as JB or Kaitlin's (since they were taken from two different shows). Due to this, many episodes involved some sort of plot device that separated Ryan from the other two, forcing them to fight separately. Almost every episode ended with either Ryan or JB destroying the monster of the day (Kaitlin never got to destroy any on her own), at which point his missing comrade(s) would come running up to inquire how the fight went. The only time the group fought "together" or in battle grid mode was all original American footage, with the Battle Grid suits being low-quality spandex and the helmets simple recolors of the red ranger's from Mighty Morphin' Power Rangers. For the show's first season, there was almost never any original American footage outside of the Battle Grid. Similar to Power Rangers, more U.S. fights were featured in the show's second season.

VR Troopers as an adaptation is different in many ways from Power Rangers and Big Bad Beetleborgs. Because it was syndicated (instead of broadcast on Fox Kids like the former two), the monsters were destroyed more violently; mutant/robot destructions included the monster being split in half, impaled, and decapitated. None of the VR Trooper forms were given names since none of them had one main color.

The show lasted two seasons (1994–'95 and '95–'96) with nearly 100 episodes. Although the show generated ratings almost comparable to the Power Rangers franchise, by 1996 all of the fight footage had been used up. All three of the Metal Hero shows used in the series had a lot of human vs. human battles. However, because the fights featured close-ups of Japanese actors, it was deemed unusable. Distance shots of Japanese actors from Shaider were usable in some of the fights, and battles with the monster footage were also kind of limited (splicing up to 2–3 episodes), but otherwise such footage was limited. In addition, because many episodes of fight footage from Metalder/Shaider and Spielban were being used in a single episode, the footage ran out faster. As a result, it was cancelled, without a resolution to the series storyline, in favor of Big Bad Beetleborgs, which continued to use footage from the Metal Hero Series Juukou B-Fighter and B-Fighter Kabuto.

In Season 1, the show would open with the traditional "Today on Saban's VR Troopers" teaser, showing scenes from the episode and narrated by Dave Mallow. After the "Quest For Power" mini-series in Season 2, however, Ryan, Kaitlin, or J.B. took over the part and narrated the teaser in first-person).

Various voice actors were listed under different pseudonyms in this series. For example, in the Season 1 end credits, Kerrigan Mahan was credited under his pseudonym, Ryan O'Flannigan (which was also the name credited for doing the voice of Goldar in the early seasons of Mighty Morphin Power Rangers); in Season 2, he would be credited under his real name and was properly identified as Jeb's voiceover. Likewise, Richard Epcar was occasionally listed in the end credits under a pseudonym of his own, Richard George (although he was credited under his real name for the first two episodes of the series), and Mike Reynolds was credited under the name Ray Michaels.

Home media
In the US five VHS videos were released: "Lost Memories", "Oh Brother", "Computer Captive", "Error in the System", and "Virtual V6". Each VHS release contained a bonus music video.

In the U.K., two videos were released through PolyGram Video and 4 Front Video (a subsidiary of PolyGram), Vol.1 contained "The Battle Begins: Parts 1 and 2" and Vol.2 contains "Battle For The Books" and "Katlin's Little Helper". In the 2000s, four DVDs were released by FOX Kids Europe/Jetix Europe and Maximum Entertainment Ltd. They included three single disc Volumes and a Mega-Disc DVD that contained 8 various episodes that were released across the first three volumes and a couple of episodes that were not released on any of the three previous discs.

On June 15, 2011, all episodes of VR Troopers were made available on Netflix until February 1, 2021. In 2015, episodes were available on Kabillion, a video-on-demand service.

On March 12, 2012, it was revealed in Home Media Magazine that Power Rangers (Mighty Morphin Power Rangers to Power Rangers RPM), VR Troopers, Big Bad Beetleborgs/Beetleborgs Metallix,  and Ninja Turtles: The Next Mutation would be released on DVD through a deal signed by Shout! Factory and Saban Brands.

On October 2, 2012, VR Troopers: Season 1, Volume 1 was released on DVD in the US by Shout! Factory. Shout! Factory released VR Troopers: Season 1, Volume 2 on DVD in the US on January 15, 2013. On May 14, 2013 Shout! Factory released VR Troopers: Season 2, Volume 1 on DVD in the US. VR Troopers: Season 2, Volume 2 on DVD in the US was scheduled for release by Shout! Factory on September 10, 2013. However, due to poor sales of the first three volumes, the release was cancelled.

Volume 2 was released as a Shout! Select title on January 14, 2014.

Other media

Games
Jeb's Rescue, Ryan's Challenge, and JB's Battle - Three games for MGA's Game Wizard

VR Troopers – When Worlds Collide - A handheld game by Tiger

VR Troopers, a video game for the Sega Genesis

Saban's VR Troopers - A board game by Milton Bradley

Comics
In 1995, Marvel Comics published a flipbook five issues mini-series entitled Mighty Morphin Power Rangers: Ninja Rangers/VR Troopers which featured the Power Rangers on one side and the VR Troopers on the other.

References

External links
 

 
1994 American television series debuts
1996 American television series endings
1990s American science fiction television series
American action television series
American adventure television series
American fantasy television series
American science fiction television series
American superhero television series
American television series based on Japanese television series
English-language television shows
First-run syndicated television programs in the United States
Japan in non-Japanese culture
Martial arts television series
Metal Hero Series
Television shows adapted into comics
Television shows adapted into video games
Teen superhero television series
Television series about teenagers
Television series created by Haim Saban
Television series by Saban Entertainment
Television shows about virtual reality
Television shows set in California
Television series about mutants